The 81st Infantry Division (81-ya Pekhotnaya Diviziya) was an infantry formation of the Russian Imperial Army.

Organization
1st Brigade
321st Infantry Regiment
322nd Infantry Regiment
2nd Brigade
323rd Infantry Regiment
324th Infantry Regiment

References

Infantry divisions of the Russian Empire